Bhata  is a village in Pakistan which is located in the centre of Mandra-Chowk Pindori Road, Tehsil Gujar Khan District Rawalpindi.

The village is at 8 km from GT (Grand Trunk) Road Mandra. Majority of people are government employed like teachers, Punjab police, army, navy, air force, patwaris, traffic police etc.

History of Bhata 
Bhata is a historical village. Bhata was settled between 1380 AD and 1400 AD.  There is a six-hundred-year-old cemetery and a mosque here. Some distance to the west of Bhata is the historical cemetery of Sardaran Ghakhran, whose total area was about eighty kanals. And the graves of his two brave brothers, Sher Khan Gakhar and Fateh Khan Gakhar, are in the four walls of the fort, which are blackened here.
There are three arches on the western inner wall of Baristan's four walls, the central arch is large and the right and left ones are slightly smaller. There are round towers on the four corners. In 1580, Sulaiman Khan settled Bhata in the true sense. After the arrival of Sulaiman Khan, the Janjua Rajput's family settled here.

Educational institutions 

 SAIJ Government Boys High School Bhata
 Government Girls High School, Bhata
 Government Primary School, Bhata (Non functional)
 Madrissa Jamia Masjid Ghousia Chistia, Bhata

Location and geography 
Bhata is located in the Pothohar Plateau near heart of potohar Gujar Khan.

Hospitals 

 Basic Health Unit Ghousia Chowk
Basic Health Unit is 2.5 km away from Bhata.

Post office 
There is Post Office in Bhata.

Telecommunication 

The PTCL provides the main network of landline telephones. Many ISPs and all major mobile phone and wireless companies operating in Pakistan provide service in Bhata.

Languages 

 Pothowari is the main language of Bhata; other languages are Urdu, Punjabi and English.

Religion

Other villages near Bhata 

 Kurizada Sawan کورزادہ سواں
 Mohra Nojo موہڑہ نوجو
 Mohra Dhamial موہڑہ دھمیال
 Azizpur Gujran عزیز پور گجراں
 Basanta بسنتہ
 Cheren جھیڑیں
 Noor Dolal نوردولال
 Gumti گمٹی
 Bishandot بشنڈوٹ
 Kuri Dolal کوری دولال
 Arazi Hasnaal اراضی حسنال
 Phalina پھلینہ

Transport 

 Bhata is situated on the Mandra-Chowk Pindori Road. Gujar Khan city is about 18 kilometers away, Rawalpindi – Islamabad is about 45 kilometers, Mandra is 8 Kilometers, Rawat is 22 kilometers and Kallar Syedan is about 16 kilometers from Bhata. There are many ways to get around in Bhata, including public transport, buses, various kinds of private hire vehicles including vans, cars, taxis, and auto-rickshaws, motorcycles, and tractors.
 Mandra Junction railway station and Gujar Khan Railway Station are the nearest railway stations.
 Islamabad International Airport is located at a distance of 70 km from Bhata.

References 
http://www.pbs.gov.pk/sites/default/files/bwpsr/punjab/RAWALPINDI_BLOCKWISE.pdf

Populated places in Gujar Khan Tehsil
Populated places in Rawalpindi District
Rawalpindi District
Gujar Khan
Gujar Khan Tehsil